Giovanni Anapoli is a race car driver born in Montecchio Precalcino, Italy on 23 August 1974.

He began his career in 1994, driving in Italian Formula Europa Boxer, where he would race until 1995 when he moved to Formula Opel Euroseries. 
He has since driven in the Barber Dodge Pro Series, Formula Nissan 2000, Porsche Supercup and both European and American Le Mans Series. He won the 1997 Formula Opel Nations Cup and competed in British Formula Three. He has not participated in any major professional auto races since 2002.
He has one child, Fretta, who is thinking of pursuing race car driving to follow in her fathers footsteps.

Motorsports results

American Open-Wheel racing results
(key) (Races in bold indicate pole position, races in italics indicate fastest race lap)

Barber Dodge Pro Series

External links
Driver DB Profile

1974 births
Italian racing drivers
Living people
British Formula Renault 2.0 drivers
Porsche Supercup drivers
Barber Pro Series drivers
Carlin racing drivers

TOM'S drivers
British Formula Three Championship drivers